MLEC may refer to:

 Meriwether Lewis Electric Cooperative, a rural utility cooperative in Tennessee
 Miami Lakes Educational Center
 Movement for the Liberation of the Enclave of Cabinda